AAMI is an Australian insurance provider.

AAMI or Aami may also refer to:

 Aami, a 2018 Indian film
 Association for the Advancement of Medical Instrumentation
 AAMI Classic, an international tennis tournament held in Kooyong, Melbourne, Australia
 AAMI Stadium, an Australian rules football stadium located in West Lakes, Adelaide
 AAMI Park, a rectangular football stadium located in the Melbourne Sports and Entertainment Precinct
 AAMI Vase, a Group 2 Australian thoroughbred horse race